Megan Sullivan is an American lawyer and jurist. A Republican, she was elected to the Superior Court of Pennsylvania in November 2021.

References

1971 births
Judges of the Superior Court of Pennsylvania
Living people
Pennsylvania Republicans
Pennsylvania lawyers